The Argus was a newspaper in the town of Fremont, California. Floyd L. Sparks was the longtime owner of The Argus, along with the Daily Review and the Tri-Valley Herald. It was last owned by Bay Area News Group-East Bay (BANG-EB), a subsidiary of MediaNews Group, who purchased the papers from Sparks in 1985. 

The newspaper was scheduled to be closed down, with the last issue of the paper published on November 1, 2011. The Oakland Tribune, Alameda Times-Star, Hayward Daily Review, Fremont Argus and West County Times all published their last editions the same day. On November 2, subscribers will get copies of the new East Bay Tribune, a localized edition of The Mercury News. The plans were later reversed. In 2016, the paper was one of four that was merged into the East Bay Times.

References

External links
 Official site
 Archive at Newspapers.com

Mass media in Alameda County, California
Fremont, California
Newspapers published in the San Francisco Bay Area
Defunct newspapers published in California
MediaNews Group publications